Muaūpoko is a Māori iwi on the Kapiti Coast of New Zealand. 	

Muaūpoko are descended from the ancestor Tara, whose name has been given to many New Zealand landmarks, most notably Te Whanganui-a-Tara (Wellington). His people were known as Ngāi Tara, although more recently they took the name Muaūpoko, meaning the people living at the head (ūpoko) of the fish of Māui (that is, the southernmost end of the North Island.)

Muaūpoko's traditional area is in the Horowhenua/Kapiti Coast/Wellington region. In the early nineteenth century Ngāi Tara were a large iwi occupying the area between the Tararua Ranges in the east and the Tasman Sea in the west, from Sinclair Head in the south to the Rangitikei River in the north. Some hapū had even settled in Queen Charlotte Sound in the 17th century.

History 
According to the Horowhenua Commission of 1896, which inquired into the Lake Horowhenua domain, the Muaūpoko were defeated after violent conflict with Ngāti Toa and Ngāti Raukawa from the north, and were almost exterminated. They were driven into "the fastnesses of the hills", or forced to take refuge with the Whanganui and other tribes. In the 2012 New Zealand High Court case of Taueki v Police, concerning a protest at Lake Horowhenua, Justice Kós stated that the "scars of that battle remain livid today."

See also
List of Māori iwi

References

Further reading
Anderson, Robyn, and Keith Pickens. Wellington District, Port Nicholson, Hutt Valley, Porirua, Rangitikei, and Manawatu. Waitangi Tribunal Rangahaua Whanui Series. Wellington: Waitangi Tribunal, 1996.
Ballara, Angela. Iwi: the dynamics of Māori tribal organisation from c. 1769 to c. 1945. Wellington: Victoria University Press, 1998.
Ballara, Angela. "Te Whanganui-a-Tara: phases of Maori occupation of Wellington Harbour c. 1800–1840." In The making of Wellington, 1800–1914, edited by David Hamer and Roberta Nicholls, 9–34. Wellington: Victoria University Press, 1990.
"Case study 3: Waipunahau (Lake Horowhenua): restoring the mauri." In Managing waterways on farms: a guide to sustainable water and riparian management in rural New Zealand. Wellington: Ministry for the Environment, 2001.
McEwen, J. M. Rangitane: a tribal history. Auckland: Heinemann Reed, 1990.

External links
Muaūpoko in Te Ara - the Encyclopedia of New Zealand
Muaūpoko Tribal Authority

 
Iwi and hapū